The Tarjados Formation is an Early to Middle Triassic geologic formation in the Ischigualasto-Villa Unión Basin of La Rioja Province in northwestern Argentina. The red to whitish sandstones and conglomerates of the formation were deposited in an arid fluvial environment. The formation overlies the Talampaya Formation and is overlain by the Chañares Formation of the Agua de la Peña Group.

The formation has provided fossils of an archosaur and a kannemeyeriid dicynodont, both not yet placed in a dedicated genus. The formation crops out in the Talampaya National Park, which was designated a UNESCO World Heritage Site in 2000.

Description 
The formation was first defined by Romer and Jensen in 1966, based on a type section exposed in the Sierra de Los Tarjados. The Tarjados Formation, as the underlying Talampaya Formation, belongs to the Paganzo Group.

The formation is exposed in the Talampaya National Park of La Rioja Province. The Tarjados Formation is overlain by the Chañares Formation, separated by a regional unconformity.

The sediments were deposited under arid, or semi-arid conditions.

The formation has provided fossils of an archosaur and a kannemeyeriid dicynodont, both not yet placed in a dedicated genus.

See also 
 Santa Maria Formation, contemporaneous fossiliferous formation of the Paraná Basin in southeastern Brazil
 Katberg Formation, contemporaneous fossiliferous formation of the Karoo Basin in South Africa
 Fremouw Formation, contemporaneous fossiliferous formation of Antarctica

References

Bibliography

Further reading 
 

Geologic formations of Argentina
Triassic System of South America
Early Triassic South America
Middle Triassic South America
Triassic Argentina
Anisian Stage
Ladinian Stage
Olenekian Stage
Sandstone formations
Conglomerate formations
Aeolian deposits
Fluvial deposits
Lacustrine deposits
Ischigualasto-Villa Unión Basin
Fossiliferous stratigraphic units of South America
Paleontology in Argentina
Geology of La Rioja Province, Argentina